Vlajkovac is a  village in Serbia. It is situated in the Vršac municipality, in the South Banat District, Vojvodina province.

Name

In Serbian, the village is known as Vlajkovac (Влајковац), in Romanian as Vlaicovăț, in Hungarian as Temesvajkóc, and in German as Wlajkowatz.

History
Bronze Age graves of south Russian steppe nomads was found in the village.

Ethnic groups (2002 census)
The village has a Serb ethnic majority with a seizable Romanian and Hungarian minority and its population numbering 1,178 people (2002 census).
 Serbs = 656 (55.68%)
 Romanians = 288 (24.44%)
 Hungarians = 182 (15.44%)
 Yugoslavs = 16

Population history

1961: 1,855
1971: 1,530
1981: 1,356
1991: 1,328
2002: 1,178

See also
List of places in Serbia
List of cities, towns and villages in Vojvodina

References

Further reading
Slobodan Ćurčić, Broj stanovnika Vojvodine, Novi Sad, 1996.

Populated places in Serbian Banat
Populated places in South Banat District
Vršac